The Silverwing Book Series is a series of novels by Kenneth Oppel about the adventures of a young bat. All four books, published between 1997 and 2007, are commonly assigned in the curriculum of upper elementary and middle school grades in Canada, and in some parts of the United States.

Summary

Prologue: The Great War
The great war between the birds and the beasts happened approximately 65 million years after the extinction of the dinosaurs for dominance over the land and sky. The bats, however, seeing themselves as neither birds nor beasts, remained neutral throughout the conflict. Finally a compromise was reached; the birds would control the sky, while the beasts would claim the land. However, because the bats refused to take sides, they were banished from being allowed to fly during the day—not even allowed to so much as look at the sun—ever again; only emerging at night. The war is based on Aesop's Fables called "The Birds, the Beasts and the Bat."

Sun Freedom (Silverwing and Sunwing) 
As Shade Silverwing looks at the sun, the owls destroy Tree Haven. While the Silverwing bats are migrating to Hibernaculum, he gets swept to sea. After Shade meets Marina Brightwing on an island, they head to the city. They encounter many other characters such as Zephyr, a bat who can see through the past and future, the cannibals Goth and Throbb, the rat kings Romulus and Remus, and humans who attempt to capture or kill them. Shade stays with Marina and finds his colony at Hibernaculum. After hibernating for two days,  some members of the colony go on a journey to find Cassiel, who disappeared after finding the truth about the humans. When they find a building called "paradise" with bats living in it, the colony finds out that Cassiel is absent.  While the other bats make themselves at home, Shade and Marina escape. After being separated, Shade ends up in the jungle, teams up with Orestes and finds out that sacrifices were being made at the Vampyrum Spectrum pyramid in order to banish the sun, and that Cassiel will also be a sacrifice. After Shade and Marina free the bats, owls and  rats in order to defeat Goth, the owls permit the bats to look at the sun, while Marina and Shade become mates.

Underworld (Firewing) 
Years later while Shade returns to Tree Haven for the first time, his son Griffin falls to the underground after accidentally dropping a fiery stick on his friend Luna. Finding out that dead bats live here forgetting that they died, he finds multiple bats with a strange glow. In the underworld, Cama Zotz orders the revived Goth to hunt down Griffin. Goth kills Griffin, but Shade gives up his life for Griffin and Luna, who return to the upper world.

Main characters
Shade: A silver-haired bat who is teased about his lack of size and strength. He learns about Cassiel from the colony. He is naïve to the dangerous world around him, where owls rule the skies and he dares look at the sun - which in their world is forbidden - without much idea about the consequences. This starts off a chain of events, which test both his loyalty and strength to the fellow bats. He is the main protagonist of the series who saves his colony more than once and slowly rises in the ranks to become the respected Silverwing he always wanted to be. In 'Firewing', he is a father and appears briefly in the main plot.
Marina Brightwing: An Eastern red bat and Shade's closest friend who is one year older than him. After being banded, she was banished from her colony and went to live on an island. In Silverwing after meeting Shade at the island, she escorts him to reunite with his colony. Goth tore off Marina's band. In Sunwing, Shade and Marina become mates. In Firewing, Marina's role is much more minor compared to the other two books in the series; she briefly appears in the beginning and is only mentioned in the ending. This was probably to give Griffin, their son, more character growth and development.
Goth: A cannibal bat and prince of the Vampyrum spectrum who is deceptive and cunning. He and Throbb were taken from South America to the city. His carnivorous nature makes him eat many kinds of animals, including birds, turning the owls against bats. In the first book, Goth and Throbb are captured by scientists. They escape, meet Shade and Marina, and plot to follow them to Hibernaculum, where they could kill the entire colony. In the end, Goth is injured by lightning. The demon-god Cama Zotz heals Goth and makes him King of the Vampyrum Spectrum, but Goth was killed when the high priest Voxzaco dropped a powerful explosive device on the temple in an attempt to sacrifice everyone to resurrect Cama Zotz in the Underworld. In Firewing, he attempts to take Griffin's life as his own and give Shade's life to Zotz. However, he failed, but was reborn and went to the Upperworld to restart Zotz's worship.
Griffin: Shade and Marina's son, and a Silverwing and Brightwing hybrid. He is notable for being a worrywart and having a way with words. At the end of Firewing he feels he has become a hero like Shade. Griffin and Luna are nearly killed by Goth, but Shade gives his life for the two so that they could return home to the upper world.
Luna: A female Silverwing newborn and Griffin's best friend. While the other Silverwing newborns see Griffin as boring and somewhat annoying, she sees his neurotic and worry-wart antics as amusing. Luna created "the Owl Game",  which involves landing as close to an owl as possible, which Griffin dislikes. Later, Luna, Griffin and a few Silverwing newborns see and investigate a fire in the forest. They discover humans near the campfire, and Griffin steals some fire from the humans, but accidentally drops it on Luna, who suffers fatal burns as a result.

Secondary characters

Silverwings
The Northern Bats have an Elder hierarchy, with one being elected high elder. Silverwings are based on the Silver-Haired Bat.

Ariel: Shade's mother who raises Shade after Cassiel left. At the end of Sunwing, she is elected elder.
Cassiel: Shade's father, who left the colony and see the sun. Shade notices his father is alive when Zephyr told him, finally Shade finds him in the abandoned Mayan temple being used by the Vampyrum Spectrum for sacrifices.
Mercury: A male; the only one who stays with the females and their young outside of winter.  He acts as a messenger amongst the Silverwings, befitting his namesake.
Chinook: Shade's best friend. At the end of Sunwing he and Shade become friends and brothers because his parents died and he was adopted by Ariel and Cassiel at Shade's request (though Shade kept this a secret from Chinook, believing his once-rival would never let him hear the end of it). Chinook is frequently scared, like his step-nephew Griffin, but is brave when he needs to be, and he has good survival instincts. He was once very fond of dumping snow on Shade's head, though this may have just been an attempt to gain attention from Shade and Marina.
Plato and Isis: Chinook's parents who travel with the other Silverwings to the human building at the beginning of Sunwing. They perished in the firestorm in the jungle.
Jarod, Osric, Yara, Rasha and Penumbra: Newborns; friends and admirers of Chinook.
Frieda: An elder of the Silverwing colony who is banded. She is the oldest bat in the colony, thus the wisest and helps Shade, even though he did something foolish. At the end of Sunwing, she dies at Bridge City. In the Underworld, she meets Griffin, telling him where to find the tree of life, a possible means of escape for him. She commends Griffin's desire to take Luna with him despite the fact that he knows she may slow him down.
Bathsheba: A selfish elder of the colony, who scolds Shade for breaking the law and mistrusts the animals. In the television series, Bathsheba betrays them.
Lucretia: One of the female elders who becomes a chief elder in Firewing.
Aurora: One of the female elders.
Icarus: A male; he is optimistic about what the bands foretell.
Ishmael: A Silverwing captured by the Vampyrum for the ritual. He escaped, but his brother and others did not. While helping rescue Chinook and the other captives, Ishmael knocked his brother off of the Stone and was killed seconds later by Voxzaco on the sacrificial stone.

Vampyrum Spectrum
The Vampyrum Spectrum has a monarchy. They are carnivores and eat just about anything smaller than them, including other bats. They worship the Mayan bat god Cama Zotz. Vampyrum spectrum is the Latin name of the Spectral Bat.

Throbb: Goth's fellow prisoner in the first book, who lacks courage and is forced to do his bidding. He is killed by a thunderstorm. His ghost serves Cama Zotz in the Underworld by aiding in an attempt to tunnel through to the world of the living.
Voxzaco: A High Priest talking to Cama Zotz by eating strange, possibly hallucinogenic, herbs (shrooms). His spine is crooked due to age. He is able to interpret the stone calendar that serves religious purposes. He commits suicide by dropping a bomb that destroys the temple in an attempt to sacrifice 100 hearts to Zotz. In the third book, Zotz reveals that his ghost is suffering eternal torment in his stomach for his failure. While alive, he tried to remove the heart of Ishmael's brother, but Ishmael sacrificed his life for his brother, allowing Voxzaco to devour him.
Phoenix: Zotz's female servant, whose name is derived from the phoenix, a legendary bird who rejuvenates itself through an immersion in fire. Phoenix fails to restore it with Goth, after Shade gives life for Griffin. She was to become Goth's mate when she was restored to life, but it is unknown when she will be able to do so, as it is not common for creatures to be sucked into the Underworld.
Murk: A rare benevolent Vampyrum traveling to the Tree with Shade, Yorick, Nemo and Java.

Other bats
Zephyr: An albino bat who lives in a church spire, a central hub for migrating bat colonies. He is very old and has lost his ability to see, but he uses his sonar with great accuracy. He also can see into the past and future using his ears. He has a vast knowledge of medicinal herbs.
Scirocco: A long-eared bat that led a movement among the banded bats, saying they were promised to become humans. It is unknown what happened to him, or whether he was killed by Goth and Throbb.
Penelope: A banded Brightwing who was originally part of Marina's colony. Like Marina, she was exiled from the colony for having a band. She later became one of those who followed Scirocco. She and her colony are devoured by Goth and Throbb.
Caliban: A mastiff bat who leads a survival group living in Statue Haven. The group consisted of bats used by humans to carry fire (bombs) and were led by Shade's father until he was captured by the Vampyrum Spectrum. Statue Haven was based within the statue of Christ the Redeemer above Rio de Janeiro.

Dead bats in Zotz's kingdom
Yorick: A 500-year-old Silverwing bat who always wants the way, because he has the map to the Tree. He lethally crashed into a tree, which severely damaged his wing and he has to suffer the pain.
Nemo: A fish eater living in the coastal waters way down south. He has been dead for roughly 48 years. His death was caused by being eaten.
Java: A foxwing with a wingspan of five feet, though she is a runt like Shade and even bigger than Goth. She becomes innocent toward any living thing. She does not have the gift of echolocation, which Shade does not like, but has excellent eyesight. She became lost after setting out for the Tree, having forgotten the verbal instructions the Pilgrims gave her, when Yorick found her way off course and invited her to travel with him. Unlike her two companions, she lived a full life and died of old age.

Other animals
King Boreal: The king of the owls who appears only in Sunwing. When he goes to attack Bridge City, although he is persuaded otherwise by his son, Orestes. He is also persuaded to lift the flying ban on the bats, free the imprisoned bats at the various Hibernaculums and to also give the bats the freedom to fly in the daylight if they so choose.
Brutus: An owl general who led the owls burning Tree Haven, after Shade glimpsed the sun. He dislikes bats and fought in the war to retrieve the Sun, although he wanted his species to keep control of the daylight skies and the owls won.
Orestes: A young owl prince; son of King Boreal. One of those who persuaded the owls to lift their ban on the presence of bats in daylight. He was saved by Shade from humans. In the TV adaptation, he is Brutus's son.
Romulus: King of the Northern rats who is considered a freak because of winglike flaps of skin between his fore and hind legs, which for his part led him to believe that bats and rats have a common ancestor. When his brother Prince Remus fled, he took command.
Remus: Prince of the Northern rats. He is distrustful of everyone, to the point of paranoia. He scares himself into abdication from the throne, believing a plot to poison him was afoot.
General Cortez: King of the southern rats, who appears only in Sunwing, where his youngest son is captured by Vampyrum. He and Shade stop Goth from resurrecting Zotz, and save Cassiel, Ariel, Chinook and Cortez's son. He also helps Marina save Shade. He is named after the conquistador Hernando Cortez who conquered the Aztec Empire.

Locations
Tree Haven: An oak tree where young bats are raised during the spring and summer. In Silverwing, the owls burned it down. After the new one is chosen, the females and newborns start living there at the end of Sunwing.
Stone Hold: A place where the male bats roost during the spring and summer.
Spire: The tower of a cathedral, which is a landmark in some colonies sound maps for migrating. Shade's colony came to this Spire; this is also where Shade and Marina meet Zephyr the Keeper of the Spire.
Hibernaculum: A place behind a waterfall where Shade's colony goes to hibernate during the winter.
Human Building: A bat paradise with no predators and plenty of insects, where it is always summer and they can see the sun. However, it is a place where humans take bats (northern and southern) and owls to attach explosives to them and send them south to bomb enemies.
Jungle: A rainforest, most likely in Central America. Home to the Vampyrum spectrum bats and the Pyramid. It also hosts creatures such as large insects, southern owls and other exotic things that northern bats haven't seen.
Statue Haven: A statue of Jesus Christ facing Rio de Janeiro. The survivors of the explosions from the metal disks use it as a safe haven from the Vampyrum.
The Pyramid: Home to the royal order of Vampyrum. It is filled with millions of bats. It was destroyed when Voxzaco dropped an explosive on it, killing them. Shade's family and friends escaped, although many bats—including the others—did not.
Underworld: A place created by Cama Zotz for his Vampyrum spectrum. It is beneath the earth and is mostly made up of pictures that occur in bats' minds as a result of conflicting sonal vibration, giving the appearance of images. All bats that die end up there. It is possible, but rare, for a living thing to enter the Underworld, where the denizens will notice a "glow" about them; this "glow" is the creature's life force, and it can be stolen from them. At the place where Zotz fought and killed his counterpart Nocturna, a great Tree made seemingly of fire grows. Entering it, the bats become as Nocturna has become; an observing intelligence in the natural world.

References

External links
Kenneth Oppel's Official Site
Siverwing Material

 
Novels by Kenneth Oppel
Young adult novel series
Children's fantasy novels
Young adult fantasy novels
Fantasy novel series
Canadian fantasy novels
Fictional bats